Louise Élisabeth is the name of several people:
 Louise Élisabeth of France (1727-1759, the eldest daughter of King Louis XV
 Louise Élisabeth d'Orléans (1709-1742), Queen of Spain
 Louise Élisabeth, Duchess of Berry (1695-1719), wife of Charles, Duke of Berry
 Louise Élisabeth de Bourbon (1693-1775), daughter of Louis III de Bourbon, Prince of Condé
 Louise-Élisabeth de Croÿ de Tourzel (1749-1832), Governess of the Children of France from 1789 to 1792